The Natural Moment is a studio album by jazz alto saxophonist Christopher Hollyday.

Background
This was alto saxophonist Christopher Hollyday's third album. It was pianist Brad Mehldau's first recording.

Music and recording
The album was recorded in January 1991. Hollyday "performs five of his driving originals and a song apiece from Peter Bernstein, Walter Davis Jr., John Webber, and Cole Porter."

Release and reception

The Natural Moment was released by RCA Novus. The Chicago Tribune reviewer commented that Hollyday's album "represents a musical advance over his second and almost justifies the attention given his first". The Penguin Guide to Jazz wrote that "the music seems over-intense, as if Hollyday were reacting to the usual charges of neo-conservatism by trying to prove how impolite he can be".

Track listing
"Scorpio Rising" – 7:42
"Had to Be Brad" – 4:34
"All New Meaning" – 2:45
"Point of Delirium" – 6:15
"Every Time We Say Goodbye" – 6:04
"Johnny Red" – 7:48
"Afterglow" – 5:23
"Idleism" – 4:57
"The Natural Moment" – 5:32

Personnel
 Christopher Hollyday – alto sax
 Brad Mehldau – piano
 John Webber – bass
 Ron Savage – drums

References

1991 albums
Jazz albums by American artists